Roel Koolen (born April 20, 1982 in Mierlo) was a Dutch baseball player who used to play for Kinheim and the Dutch national team.

Koolen made his Hoofdklasse debut at the Twins Sporting Club in 1998. He played for the Dutch junior team in the 1999 World Junior Championship and 2000 World Junior Championship. In 2000, Koolen moved to DOOR Neptunus and helped the team win the Holland Series in 2001, 2002, 2004 and 2005 (he was not on the team in 2003). In the 2004 playoffs, he was named MVP. During 2003 and 2004, he spent time in College in the United States. He was 3 for 17 with 3 walks in 16 games for the 2003 VCU Rams. In 2004, he hit .210/.300/.290 in 26 games.

Returning to the Netherlands full-time in 2005, the 23-year-old hit .253/.345/.326 in 26 games for Neptunus and fielded .889. He was 6 for 16 with 3 doubles in the Holland Series as the team won the title. Koolen was 4 for 9 in the 2006 Haarlem Baseball Week. After his move to Kinheim for the 2006 Hoofdklasse season, Koolen hit .324/.435/.426 with 27 walks in 42 games. He was 5th in the league in OBP and tied Eugene Kingsale, Tjerk Smeets and Evert-Jan 't Hoen for fifth in walks. He only hit .190/.292/.190 in the Holland Series but Kinheim won the title, breaking the long run by Koolen's old Neptunus mates. He was one for two with a run and RBI as Michael Duursma's backup at 2B in the 2006 Intercontinental Cup.

In 2007, Koolen hit .386/.525/.534 with 22 walks and 21 runs in 26 games. He lost the batting title by six points to Danny Rombley, was second to Fausto Alvarez in slugging and led the league in OBP. He tied for second in the league in triples (3). He was just 2 for 12 with a double in the 2007 Holland Series but Kinheim still won. In the 2007 European Cup, Koolen was 4 for 20 with a double and a triple as Kinheim won its first European Cup ever. He was 6 for 23 in the 2007 World Port Tournament. For the 2007 Baseball World Cup, Koolen replaced Yurendell de Caster at second base for the Dutch national team. He started ahead of Michael Duursma, who had had a much better career in NCAA Division I than Koolen. Koolen hit .267/.267/.267 in 8 games but the Netherlands still finished 4th, tying their best finish ever. Koolen hit .294/.409/.471 in the 2008 European Cup in Grosseto to help them win the Cup. In the 9th inning of the gold medal game, he tripled against Linc Mikkelsen and scored on a René Cremer sacrifice fly to force extra innings against Montepaschi Grosseto and give Kinheim their chance to win.

Koolen was selected by coach Robert Eenhoorn in the team that represented the Netherlands at the 2008 Summer Olympics in Beijing.

External links
Koolen's profile at honkbalsite.com

References

1982 births
Living people
Baseball players at the 2008 Summer Olympics
Dutch expatriate baseball players in the United States
Olympic baseball players of the Netherlands
People from Mierlo
Sportspeople from North Brabant